The 1994 NCAA Division II men's basketball tournament involved 48 schools playing in a single-elimination tournament to determine the national champion of men's NCAA Division II college basketball as a culmination of the 1993–94 NCAA Division II men's basketball season. It was won by California State University, Bakersfield and Southern Indiana's Stan Gouard was the Most Outstanding Player.

Regional participants

*denotes tie

Regionals

South Atlantic - Fayetteville, North Carolina 
Location: Felton J. Capel Arena Hosts: Virginia Union University and Fayetteville State University

Third Place - Elizabeth City State 88, Longwood 87

South Central - Topeka, Kansas 
Location: Lee Arena Host: Washburn University

Third Place - Central Missouri State 79, West Texas A&M 74

West - Riverside, California 
Location: UCR Student Recreation Center Host: University of California, Riverside

Third Place - Alaska–Anchorage 109, San Francisco State 97

East - California, Pennsylvania 
Location: Hamer Hall Host: California University of Pennsylvania

 Third Place - Gannon 75, Edinboro 66

Great Lakes - Evansville, Indiana 
Location: Physical Activities Center Host: University of Southern Indiana

Third Place - Kentucky Wesleyan 118, Oakland 91

North Central - Vermillion, South Dakota 
Location: DakotaDome Host: University of South Dakota

Third Place - North Dakota 97, Mesa State 88

Northeast - Philadelphia, Pennsylvania 
Location: Athletics and Recreation Center Host: Philadelphia College of Textiles and Science

Third Place - C.W. Post 84, American International 81

South - Normal, Alabama 
Location: Elmore Gymnasium Host: Alabama A&M University

Third Place - Paine 57, Eckerd 52

*denotes each overtime played

Elite Eight - Springfield, Massachusetts
Location: Springfield Civic Center Hosts: American International College and Springfield College

*denotes each overtime played

All-tournament team
 Stan Gouard (Southern Indiana)
 Roheen Oats (Cal State Bakersfield)
 Reggie Phillips (Cal State Bakersfield)
 Tyrone Tate (Southern Indiana)
 Kenny Warren (Cal State Bakersfield)

See also
1994 NCAA Division II women's basketball tournament
1994 NCAA Division I men's basketball tournament
1994 NCAA Division III men's basketball tournament
1994 NAIA Division I men's basketball tournament
1994 NAIA Division II men's basketball tournament

References
 1994 NCAA Division II men's basketball tournament jonfmorse.com

External links
 NCAA record book

NCAA Division II men's basketball tournament
Tournament
NCAA Division II basketball tournament
NCAA Division II basketball tournament